Showboat or show boat, is a boat which serves as a floating theater.

Showboat or Show Boat may also refer to:

People

 Showboat Fisher (1899 – 1994), an American baseball player

Arts, entertainment, and media

Music 
 Show Boat (1959 cast album), featuring Shirley Bassey and Dora Bryan
 Show Boat (1988 cast album), featuring Karla Burns and Jerry Hadley
 Showboat (Kenny Dorham album), 1960

Novel and adaptations
 Show Boat (novel), by Edna Ferber
Show Boat, a 1927 stage musical by Jerome Kern and Oscar Hammerstein II based on the Ferber novel
Show Boat (1936 film), adapted by Oscar Hammerstein II and directed by James Whale, based on the stage musical
 Show Boat (1951 film), adapted by John Lee Mahin and directed by George Sidney, based on the stage musical
 Show Boat (1929 film), adapted by Charles Kenyon and directed by Harry A. Pollard, based on the Ferber novel

Television
Showboaters, a 2011 British reality show

Hotels and casinos 
 Showboat Atlantic City, a hotel and former casino located in Atlantic City, New Jersey
 Showboat East Chicago, an East Chicago casino currently known as the Ameristar Casino East Chicago
 Showboat Hotel & Casino, a Las Vegas casino later known as the Castaways Hotel and Casino
 Showboat, Inc.,  a United States-based organization in the casino and entertainment industry

Other uses
 Showboat (dragster), an exhibition dragster built in the 1960s
 Showboat, the nickname of American Battleship USS North Carolina (BB-55)
 Showboating, showing off